The 2010 Tour of Flanders cycle race was the 94th edition of this monument classic and took place on 4 April. The course was 262.3 km long, starting in Bruges and finishing in Ninove. The race was won by Fabian Cancellara ahead of Tom Boonen and Philippe Gilbert.

Course
The 16 Tour of Flanders hills were:

Teams
There were 25 teams for the 2010 Tour of Flanders. They were:

ProTour Teams

Pro Continental Teams

General standings

External links
Race website

References

Tour Of Flanders
Tour Of Flanders
Tour of Flanders
Tour of Flanders